Nadezhda Vladimirovna Chizhova (born 29 September 1945) is a retired Russian shot putter who won three Olympic medals and four European titles, and set seven new world records. She retired after the 1976 Olympics and later worked as athletics coach in Saint Petersburg.

Biography
Chizhova was the fourth child in a family, and lost her father at the age of four. She took up shot put aged 16. After graduating from a local medical school, in 1963 she moved to Saint Petersburg, to train with Viktor Alekseyev, a leading Soviet coach who raised top Soviet shot putters such as Tamara Press, Galina Zybina and Tamara Tyshkevich. Two years later Chizhova won the European junior title in the shot put and discus throw, and in 1966 won the regular European title in the shot put.

By 1968 Chizhova was the world record holder and an Olympic gold medal favorite, but she finished third due to a knee injury sustained while training. After recovering, she won the European titles in 1969 and 1971 and an Olympic gold medal in 1972. She retired in 1977, after placing second at the 1976 Olympics. She quoted two reasons for retirement: waning motivation, and the death of her coach (Alekseyev) in 1977. In retirement she gave birth to a daughter and had a long career as an athletics coach. One of her trainees, Larisa Peleshenko, won a silver medal in the shot put at the 2000 Olympics.

World records
  in 1964 (world junior record)
  on 28 April 1968 in Sochi
  on 30 May 1969 in Moscow
  on 13 July 1969 in Chorzów
  on 16 September 1969 in Athens
  on 19 May 1972 in Sochi
  on 7 September 1972 in Munich
  on 28 August 1973 in Lviv

References

External links

Sporting Heroes

1945 births
Living people
People from Usolye-Sibirskoye
Russian female shot putters
Soviet female shot putters
Athletes (track and field) at the 1968 Summer Olympics
Athletes (track and field) at the 1972 Summer Olympics
Athletes (track and field) at the 1976 Summer Olympics
Olympic athletes of the Soviet Union
Olympic gold medalists for the Soviet Union
Olympic silver medalists for the Soviet Union
Olympic bronze medalists for the Soviet Union
Spartak athletes
World record setters in athletics (track and field)
European Athletics Championships medalists
Medalists at the 1976 Summer Olympics
Medalists at the 1972 Summer Olympics
Medalists at the 1968 Summer Olympics
Olympic gold medalists in athletics (track and field)
Olympic silver medalists in athletics (track and field)
Olympic bronze medalists in athletics (track and field)
Universiade medalists in athletics (track and field)
Universiade gold medalists for the Soviet Union
Universiade silver medalists for the Soviet Union
Medalists at the 1965 Summer Universiade
Medalists at the 1970 Summer Universiade
Medalists at the 1973 Summer Universiade
Sportspeople from Irkutsk Oblast